La Jubaudière is a former commune in the Maine-et-Loire department in western France.

On 15 December 2015, Andrezé, Beaupréau, La Chapelle-du-Genêt, Gesté, Jallais, La Jubaudière, Le Pin-en-Mauges, La Poitevinière, Saint-Philbert-en-Mauges and Villedieu-la-Blouère merged becoming one commune called Beaupréau-en-Mauges.

Geography
The commune is traversed by the Èvre river.

See also
Communes of the Maine-et-Loire department

References

Jubaudiere